Baayork Lee (born December 5, 1946) is an American actress, singer, dancer, choreographer, theatre director, and author.

Early life and career

Lee was born in New York City's Chinatown, to an Indian mother and Chinese father. She started dancing at an early age, and she made her Broadway debut at the age of five as Princess Ying Yawolak in the original production of The King and I in 1951. In a 2004 interview, she stated that Yul Brynner, the original king, was like a second father to her. After she outgrew her role in The King and I, she continued to study in ballet, modern, and afro-Cuban dance. She appeared in George Balanchine's original production of The Nutcracker, where she met ballerina Maria Tallchief, whom she idolized.

While attending the High School for Performing Arts, she met fellow student Michael Bennett. Around the same time, she appeared in Flower Drum Song. Though she was offered a scholarship to Juilliard, Lee instead pursued her career in theatre. Her Broadway appearances included Mr. President, Golden Boy, and Here's Love. 

Her next three shows were all choreographed by Bennett: A Joyful Noise, Henry, Sweet Henry, and Promises, Promises. In the last, she performed the dance number "Turkey Lurkey Time" (with Donna McKechnie and Margo Sappington). Lee was the dance captain for Promises, Promises and recreated the choreography for subsequent touring productions, starting her future path as a choreographer. In 1973, she travelled to Israel to film Norman Jewison's version of Jesus Christ Superstar.

A Chorus Line and Michael Bennett

In 1973, she appeared in Bennett's Seesaw, assisted with choreography, and was featured opposite Tommy Tune.

In 1975, Lee was invited by Bennett to participate in the workshops from which A Chorus Line was developed. The character of Connie Wong was, in large part, based upon her life. Along with the cast, she won the 1976 Theatre World Award for Ensemble Performance for the show. Fifteen years later, along with cast member Thommie Walsh and Robert Viagas, she documented the evolution of A Chorus Line in the book On the Line: The Creation of A Chorus Line, published in 1990. 

In the decades following the original Broadway production, she has directed or choreographed many productions of the musical, including the most recent Broadway revival in 2006. The 2008 feature documentary Every Little Step chronicles the casting process of the 2006 revival. 

Lee became one of Bennett's closest collaborators, and she helped to develop the choreography in many of his subsequent shows.

Choreography and directing career

Starting in the 1970s, Lee began to focus on choreographing, first with a production of Where's Charley? in New Jersey.

Since then, she has directed national and international tours of The King & I, Carmen Jones, Bombay Dreams, Rodgers and Hammerstein's Cinderella, 
Porgy and Bess, Jesus Christ Superstar, and Barnum. She was the associate choreographer for Tommy Tune for a time. She has choreographed several productions for the Washington National Opera at the Kennedy Center. She also choreographed the troubled production of Marilyn: An American Fable.

Other projects include becoming a talent scout for Tokyo Disneyland, opening a musical theater school in Seoul, South Korea, and producing various shows. In 2018, she choreographed New York City Center's Gala production of A Chorus Line. 

She directed and choreographed South Pacific for City Springs Theatre Company in Sandy Springs, Georgia in 2019.

Awards 
Columbia College Chicago honored Lee during their 2003 Women Warrior Festival presented by the College's Center for Asian Arts and Media. Lee gave a keynote address and was a 2003 Woman Warrior Honoree. The Actors’ Equity Foundation gave her the Paul Robeson Citation Award in 2014.

In 2017, Lee received the Isabelle Stevenson Tony Award, which honors members of the theater industry for their significant contributions to charitable causes. She was honored for her longstanding commitment to future generations of artists through her work with the National Asian Artists Project (NAAP) and theatre education programs around the world. Lee is a co-founder of NAAP, a non-profit that showcases the work of Asian-American theatre artists through performance, outreach, and educational programming.

References

Notes 
 Flinn, Denny Martin, What They Did for Love: The Untold Story Behind the Making of A Chorus Line, Bantam, 1989, 
 Viagas, Robert, Baayork Lee, Thommie Walsh, On the Line: the Creation of A Chorus Line, Morrow, 1990,

External links 
 Baayork Lee's website
 National Asian Artists Project website

 
 Baayork Lee Celebrates 40 Years of A Chorus Line – Playbill Video

American female dancers
Dancers from New York (state)
American choreographers
American theatre directors
Women theatre directors
American actresses
American people of Indian descent
1946 births
Living people
Writers from New York City
Fiorello H. LaGuardia High School alumni
American dancers of Asian descent
American people of Chinese descent
American theatre directors of Chinese descent
21st-century American women